Petrushka is a Russian puppet.

Petrushka may also refer to:

Petrushka (ballet), a ballet by Igor Stravinsky
Petrushka (horse), a racehorse
"Petrouchka" (song), 2021 Soso Maness song

See also
Petruška or Petruska, people with the surname
Petrushka chord, a recurring polytonal device used in Igor Stravinsky's ballet Petrushka and in later music